Daniel Howard may refer to:

 Daniel Howard (rugby league) (born 1984), rugby league footballer
 Daniel Edward Howard (1861–1935), President of Liberia
 J. Daniel Howard (born 1943), U.S. Under Secretary of the Navy
 Danny Howard (born 1987), British dance music DJ and producer
 Dan Howard (born 1976), Australian volleyball player